Cesco may refer to:

People

Given name 
 Cesco Agterberg (born 1975), Dutch soccer coach
 Cesco Baseggio (1897–1971), Italian actor

Surname 
 Carlos Ulrrico Cesco (died 1987), Argentine astronomer
 Mario R. Cesco, astronomer and son of C. U. Cesco

Other uses 
 1571 Cesco, a main-belt asteroid

See also 
 Francis (given name)